The Netherlands Football League Championship 1902–1903 was contested by eighteen teams participating in three divisions. This season, the western division had been split in two, creating the Eerste Klasse West-A and the Eerste Klasse West-B. The national champion would be determined by a play-off featuring the winners of the three divisions of the Netherlands. HVV Den Haag won this year's championship by beating Vitesse Arnhem and Volharding.

New entrants
Eerste Klasse West-A:
Sparta Rotterdam returned after one year of absence

Eerste Klasse West-B: (new division)
Moved from Division East:
Hercules
Moved from Division West-A:
HBS Creayenhout
Rapiditas Rotterdam
Koninklijke HFC
New:
Quick 1890
Volharding

Divisions

Eerste Klasse East

Eerste Klasse West-A

Eerste Klasse West-B

Championship play-off

References
RSSSF Netherlands Football League Championships 1898-1954
RSSSF Eerste Klasse Oost
RSSSF Eerste Klasse West

Netherlands Football League Championship seasons
1902 in Dutch sport
1903 in Dutch sport